Victor Bustamante (born 22 August 1994) is a Spanish figure skater. He is a four-time Spanish national junior champion and has competed at three World Junior Championships.

Programs

Competitive highlights 
JGP: Junior Grand Prix

References

External links 
 

1994 births
Spanish male single skaters
Living people
Sportspeople from Barcelona